George Corner may refer to:

 George W. Corner (1889–1981), American physician, embryologist and pioneer of the contraceptive pill
 George Richard Corner (1801–1863), English antiquarian

See also
 Corner (surname)